This is the discography for Belgian post-industrial/acid house/techno band Lords of Acid.

Studio albums
 1991 Lust
 1994 Voodoo-U
 1997 Our Little Secret
 2000 Farstucker
 2012 Deep Chills
 2018 Pretty in Kink
 2022 Beyond Booze

Compilations
 1998 Heaven Is an Orgasm
 1999 Expand Your Head
 2001 On the Racks
 2002 Private Parts
 2003 Greatest T*ts
 2016 Smoking Hot

Other releases
 1993 Appearances Are Deceptive (as Digital Orgasm; also packaged in some countries as DO It)
 1994 To The Top (as Channel X; re-issued in 1997 as Tuned In... Turned On) 
 1998 Rejected Tracks (Bonus CD from Praga Khan - Pragamatic)

Singles
 1989 "I Sit on Acid"
 1990 "Hey Ho!"
 1991 "Take Control"
 1991 "Rough Sex"
 1993 "I Must Increase My Bust"
 1994 "The Crablouse"
 1995 "Do What You Wanna Do"
 1996 "I Sit on Acid"
 1997 "Rubber Doll"
 1998 "Pussy"
 1999 "Am I Sexy?"
 1999 "Lover"
 2000 "Lover Boy/Lover Girl"
 2003 "Gimme Gimme"
 2003 "Scrood Bi U"
 2011 "Little Mighty Rabbit"
 2012 "Pop That Tooshie"
 2012 "Paranormal Energy"
 2012 "Vampire Girl"

Music videos
 "Take Control"
 "The Crablouse"
 "Acid Queen"
 "I Sit On Acid 2000"
 "Scrood Bi U"
 "Gimme Gimme"
 "Little Mighty Rabbit"
 "Pop That Tooshie"

Motion picture soundtrack appearances
1992 Bad Lieutenant - "Lets Get High"
1993 Sliver - "The Most Wonderful Girl"
1995 Virtuosity - "Young Boys"
1995 Strange Days - "Drink My honey", "The Real Thing"
1999 The Debtors - "Pussy", "Lets Get High", "Special Moments"
1999 Austin Powers: The Spy Who Shagged Me - "Am I Sexy?"
2000 The Wog Boy - "Am I Sexy?"
2000 Whipped - "Am I Sexy?"
2002 40 Days and 40 Nights - "Spank My Booty"
2003 A Man Apart - "Rover Take Over"
2004 Paparazzi - "Sex Bomb"
2007 Ben X - "Glad I'm Not God", "Feed My Hungry Soul"

Music in television
2003 Malcolm in the Middle Season 5, Episode 1: "Vegas" - "Am I Sexy?"
2010 Top Gear 2010 Specials, Episode 1: American Road Trip - "The Crablouse"

Trailers
2000 Dinosaur - "The Crablouse"
2000 What Women Want - "Am I Sexy?"
2002 xXx - "Take Control"
2005 Chicken Little - "The Crablouse"
2010 Party Down - "Am I Sexy?"
2010 Sucker Punch - "The Crablouse"

References

Discographies of Belgian artists
Electronic music discographies